The New York Emperors Stickball League is a stickball league in The Bronx, New York City. Established in 1985, the league has nine teams and a youth division. The seasons lasts from 180 games to 240 games a season.

Current teams
Jersey City Saints
Bronx Diamondbacks
Emperors
Silver Bullets
Leland Legends
Bronx Royals
The Gold
Bronx Ravens
Sugar Hill

Emperors Memorial Day Weekend Classic
The Emperors League hosts an annual tournament every Memorial Day weekend. The tournament attracts teams from Manhattan, southern California, Florida, and Puerto Rico.

Presidents of the NYESL
Joe Cruz (1985-1993)
Robert Martinez (1993-1996)
Pete Santiago (1997-2000)
Steve Mercado (2000-2001)
Eddie Rivera (2001-2002)
Jennifer Lippold (2002-2004)
Richie Marrero (2004-2006)
Ervido Creales (2006-2016)
Jennifer Lippold (2016 - present)

References

External links
 http://www.stickball.com/

Sports in New York City
Sports leagues in the United States
1985 establishments in New York City
Sports leagues established in 1985
Sports in the Bronx